Veysel Özgür (1877 in Trabzon – October 15, 1931) was an officer of the Ottoman Army and the Turkish Army.

Medals and decorations
Gallipoli Star (Ottoman Empire)
Silver Medal of Liyakat
Silver Medal of Imtiyaz
Prussia Iron Cross 2nd class
Medal of Independence with Red Ribbon

See also
List of high-ranking commanders of the Turkish War of Independence

Sources

1877 births
1931 deaths
People from Trabzon
Ottoman Military Academy alumni
Ottoman Army officers
Ottoman military personnel of the Balkan Wars
Ottoman military personnel of World War I
Turkish Army officers
Turkish military personnel of the Greco-Turkish War (1919–1922)
Burials at Turkish State Cemetery
Recipients of the Liakat Medal
Recipients of the Imtiyaz Medal
Recipients of the Iron Cross (1914), 2nd class
Recipients of the Medal of Independence with Red Ribbon (Turkey)